Sphenomorphus tritaeniatus  is a species of skink found in Vietnam.

References

tritaeniatus
Taxa named by René Léon Bourret
Reptiles described in 1937
Reptiles of Vietnam